Amnesia is a 2014 novel by Australian author Peter Carey.

Plot summary

The novel follows the story of journalist Felix Moore who is writing an investigative piece about Gaby Baillieux, a young Australian computer hacker.  Baillieux has written a computer virus which is originally intended to open the doors of Australian prison cells, but which also finds its way to the US.

The novel makes connections between various incidents in Australia's past (the 1942 Battle of Brisbane and the 1975 sacking of the Whitlam government) to build a picture of conspiracy and political interference.

Reviews

 Andrew Motion in The Guardian
 Ron Charles in The Washington Post

Awards
 2015 shortlisted for the Indie Awards - Fiction
 2013 longlisted for the ALS Gold Medal
 2014 shortlisted for the Australian Book Industry Awards (ABIA) — Australian Literary Fiction Book of the Year

References

2014 Australian novels
Novels by Peter Carey (novelist)
Faber and Faber books